Russell Miller Faulkinberry (November 3, 1928 – November 16, 2005) was an American college football player and coach. He served as the head football coach at the University of Southwestern Louisiana—now known as the University of Louisiana at Lafayette—from 1961 to 1973, compiling a record of 66–63–2. Faulkinberry played college football as a tackle at Vanderbilt University from 1947 to 1950.  As a senior, he was captain of the 1950 Vanderbilt Commodores football team and was named to the 1950 All-SEC football team. Faulkinberry was an assistant coach at Southeastern Louisiana University, Iowa State University, Texas A&M University, and the University of Nebraska–Lincoln before he was hired at Southwestern Louisiana. He died on November 16, 2005 after a long illness. Faulkinberry was the son of football coach Frank Faulkinberry.

Faulkinberry's tenure brought about the change of Southwestern Louisiana's fight name from the "Bulldogs" to the "Raging Cajuns". One of his assistant coaches once remarked, "Go out there and rage like a bunch of Cajuns!" The phrase stuck both because a majority of the players were from south Louisiana and because fans, students, and alumni loved the phrase. Later on, the University of Southwestern Louisiana trademarked the phrase and, to this day, the sports teams are known as the "Ragin' Cajuns."

Military service
Faulkinberry served in the United States Navy during the Korean War.

Death
Faulkinberry died on November 16, 2005, in Lafayette, Louisiana, at the age of 77. He was buried in Lafayette Memorial Park.

Head coaching record

References

1928 births
2005 deaths
American football tackles
Iowa State Cyclones football coaches
Louisiana Ragin' Cajuns football coaches
Nebraska Cornhuskers football coaches
Southeastern Louisiana Lions football coaches
Texas A&M Aggies football coaches
Vanderbilt Commodores football players
United States Navy personnel of the Korean War
People from Murfreesboro, Tennessee
Coaches of American football from Tennessee
Players of American football from Tennessee
Military personnel from Tennessee